The Last Year is a 1951 East German drama film directed by E.W. Fiedler and Hans Heinrich and starring Inge Keller, Hans Klering and Hermann Stövesand. It was made by the state-controlled DEFA in communist East Germany. Filming took place at the Johannisthal Studios in Berlin. The film's sets were designed by Wilhelm Depenau and Artur Günther.

Cast
 Inge Keller as Charly
 Hans Klering as Heini Holler
 Hermann Stövesand as Ferdinand
 Peter Marx as Schorsch
 Gustav Püttjer as Gustav
 Ralf Siebert as Moses
 Gerd Frickhöffer as Blague
 Otto Stübler as Konsul
 Reinhard Kolldehoff as Kommissar
 Lutz Götz as Moulin
 Peter Lehmbrock as 1. Heizer
 Hans Rose as 2. Heizer
 Werner Pledath as Kapitän
 Helmut Bautzmann as Französischer Seemann
 Johannes Bergfeldt as Holländischer Seemann
 Maria Besendahl as Frau Primm
 Albrecht Bethge as Höherer SS-Offizier
 Louis Brody
 Friedrich Wilhelm Dann as Englischer Dolmetscher
 Georg Dücker as Deutscher Dolmetscher
 Hans Fiebrandt as Gestapobeamter Möller
 Ursula Friese as Hafenmädchen
 Gerhard Gustke as Französischer Polizist
 Hans Jaeckel as SS-Protokollführer
 Wolf Kaiser as Langer SS-Mann
 Johannes Knittel as Sekretär der ISH
 Hans-Erich Korbschmitt as Gestapobeamter Schröder
 Alwin Lippisch as Mexiaknischer Kapitän
 Frank Michelis as Französischer Lagerarbeiter
 Erwin Mosblech as Französischer Polizist
 Gerda Müller as Hafenmädchen
 Erich Nadler as Irischer Seemann
 Willi Narloch as Spanischer Dolmetscher
 Peter Peterz as Kanzleisekretär
 Conrad Pfenning as SS-Arzt
 Günther Polensen as Französischer Polizeioffizier
 Hannes Ponsel as Gestapobeamter Franke
 Herbert Richter as Bootsmann
 Martin Rickelt as 1. deutscher Seemann
 Michael Symo as 1. Offizier der »Tampico«
 Friedrich Teitge as Ansager
 Nico Turoff as Französischer Seemann
 Christine von Trümbach as Frau Moulin

References

Bibliography
 Dieter Reimer. DEFA-Stars. Militzke Verlag, 2004.

External links
 

1951 films
1951 drama films
German drama films
East German films
1950s German-language films
Films directed by Hans Heinrich
Seafaring films
Films set in the 1930s
Films based on German novels
German black-and-white films
1950s German films
Films shot at Johannisthal Studios